Broken is a six-part British television drama series, created by Jimmy McGovern, that first broadcast on BBC One on 30 May 2017. The series focuses on Michael Kerrigan (Sean Bean), the priest of a Roman Catholic parish in a northern English city, who despite suffering from his own troubles stemming from a traumatic childhood, tries to guide several of his most vulnerable parishioners through the trials and tribulations of everyday life. 

The series was directed by Ashley Pearce and Noreen Kershaw; while Shaun Duggan, Colette Kane and Nick Leather all contributed to McGovern's scripts. The series was released on DVD on 10 July 2017.

Bean won a BAFTA for Best Actor while Friel was nominated for Best Supporting Actress.

Cast

Main
 Sean Bean as Father Michael Kerrigan
 Adrian Dunbar as Father Peter Flaherty 
 Anna Friel as Christina Fitzsimmons
 Muna Otaru as Helen Oyenusi 
 Mark Stanley as PC Andrew Powell 
 Aisling Loftus as PC Dawn Morris
 Paula Malcomson as Roz Demichelis 
 Ned Dennehy as Karl McKenna
 Danny Sapani as Daniel Martin

Supporting
 Clare Calbraith as Mariella Fitzsimmons
 Paul Copley as Joe Kerrigan 
 Iain Hoskins as Policeman
 Vanessa Earl as Beth Kerrigan 
 Steve Garti as Eddie Kerrigan
 Jerome Holder as Vernon Oyenusi
 Lauren Lyle as Chloe Demichelis
 David McClelland as Christopher Kerrigan
 Faye McKeever as Caroline Powell 
 Eileen Nicholas as 'Nan' Fitzsimmons
 Naomi Radcliffe as Pauline Pickering
 Sam Rintoul as Young Michael Kerrigan 
 Rochenda Sandall as Jean Reid
 Matthew Wilson as PC Ian Wakefield

Production and filming
The series, produced by LA Productions, was commissioned in 2015; with filming taking place throughout 2016.

This series was filmed in Liverpool, although the city is not directly mentioned in the series itself. Some scenes are shot in trains, implying that Father Michael commutes between his Merseyside parish and his Irish mother and second-generation siblings in Sheffield. The featured church is St Francis Xavier Church, Liverpool.

Episodes

Broadcast
The series was originally due to begin on 23 May, but the broadcast was postponed following the Manchester Arena bombing the previous night, and was replaced in the schedules by a repeat of Planet Earth II. This was due to the nature of the storyline in the first episode, which focuses on mum-of-three Christina Fitzsimmons (Anna Friel), who after losing her job, resorts to keeping her mother's death a secret in order to continue claiming her state pension.

References

External links
 
 

2017 British television series debuts
2017 British television series endings
2010s British crime television series
2010s British drama television series
BBC television dramas
English-language television shows
Television shows shot in Liverpool